Isthmiade rubra is a species of beetle in the family Cerambycidae. It was described by Bates in 1873.

References

Isthmiade
Beetles described in 1873